Craugastor yucatanensis, also known as the Yucatan robber frog or Yucatan rainfrog, is a species of frog in the family Craugastoridae. It is endemic to the northern part of the Yucatan Peninsula, Mexico. Both terrestrial and arboreal in its lifestyle, its natural habitat are tropical lowland semi-deciduous and deciduous forests. It is threatened by habitat loss caused by tourism.

References

yucatanensis
Endemic amphibians of Mexico
Amphibians described in 1965
Taxonomy articles created by Polbot
Taxa named by John Douglas Lynch
Fauna of the Yucatán Peninsula